The Civil Aviation Act 1969, is a Malaysian law which was enacted to make better provision in the law relating to Civil Aviation and for matters connected therewith and ancillary to it.

Structure
The Civil Aviation Act 1969, in its current form (27 August 2015), consists of 10 Parts containing 28 sections and 1 schedule (including 8 amendments).
 Part I: Preliminary
 Part IA: Duties and Functions of the Director General of Civil Aviation Malaysia
 Part II: Regulation of Civil Aviation
 Part III: Establishment and Operation of Aerodromes
 Part IIIA: Civil Aviation Fund
 Part IV: Control of Obstructions in Vicinity of Aerodromes
 Part V: Liability for Damage Caused by Aircraft
 Part VI: Detention of Aircraft
 Part VII: Wreck and Salvage
 Part VIII: Restriction on Claims for Damages and Compensation
 Part VIIIA: Licence to Provide Airport and Aviation Services
 Part VIIIB: Enforcement and Investigation
 Part IX: Miscellaneous
 Part X: Transitionals
 Schedule

References

External links
 Civil Aviation Act 1969 

1969 in Malaysian law
Malaysian federal legislation
Civil aviation in Malaysia
1969 in aviation